Lars Windfeld (born 3 October 1962) is a Danish former professional footballer who played as a goalkeeper for Aarhus Gymnastikforening (AGF). He played a total 221 games for AGF in all competitions, including 196 games in the Danish Superliga championship, and scoring one goal against Odense BK in March 1995. He also won the 1996 Danish Cup with the club. He was named 1995 Danish Football Goalkeeper of the Year. He represented the Denmark national team in an unofficial match in August 1996.

Windfeld ended his active career in 2000, and became a businessman. In February 2005, he stepped in as CEO of AGF, and helped turn the financial hardships of the club into a small surplus. In November 2008, he went on an indefinite hiatus due to stress. The second half of 2008 turned out another economic loss for AGF, and in March 2009, Windfeld left the job in AGF. He subsequently came under police scrutiny, for the conduct of his private business ventures, but all charges were dropped within days.

References

1962 births
Living people
Danish men's footballers
Aarhus Gymnastikforening players
Association football goalkeepers